"Midnight Magic Man" is a song written by Neil Levenson and Hank Hunter. It was covered by a couple of groups before it was a top 20 hit for singer Nash Chase in 1973.

Background
The song was written by Neil Levenson and Hank Hunter, aka Henry Hadad, Jr. It was recorded by Franklyn Circle in 1971, and was released on Laurie Records. Also in 1971, it appeared on the B side of Triangle's "Judge And Jury", released on Paramount Records.

Nash Chase recording
The single backed with "Fantasy" was released on the HMV label in 1972. It was then released by Columbia. The A side was written by Hunter, Levenson, and produced by Mike Le Petit. The B side "Fantasy" was written by Michael Hoeta.

It registered at no 20 in the New Zealand charts on April 2, 1973. BY April 16, 1973, it was at no 18. It had moved up one notch from the previous weeks position of 19. The number one song on the charts at the time was "Blockbuster" by The Sweet. It spent three weeks on the N.Z. charts.

It appears on the CD album, The Very Best of Nash Chase EMI 583045. It also appears on the various artists compilation, Kiwi Classics Volume 6, EMI – 532953 2, which was released in 2001, and Explosive Hits 73, EMI Hits 3, which was released on LP in the seventies.

References

1972 singles
1972 songs
Nash Chase songs